"I'm Coming Home" may refer to:

 “I’m Coming Home” (Ai song), 2020 single by Ai
 "I'm Coming Home" (Tom Jones song), a 1967 song written by John Mason and Les Reed
 I'm Coming Home (album), a 1973 Johnny Mathis album 
 "I'm Coming Home" (Johnny Mathis song)", a 1973 song written by Thom Bell and Linda Creed
 "I'm Coming Home", a 1980 single by Birtles & Goble
 "I'm Coming Home", a 1956 song by Johnny Horton
 "I'm Comin' Home", a 1971 song by Tommy James

See also
 I'm Going Home (disambiguation)
 Coming Home (disambiguation)